Kalateh-ye Sadat-e Bala may refer to:
 Kalateh-ye Sadat-e Bala, Razavi Khorasan
 Kalateh-ye Sadat-e Bala, Semnan

See also
 Kalateh-ye Sadat (disambiguation)